Dmitry Sergeyevich Vorobyov (born October 18, 1985 in Tolyatti) is a Russian professional ice hockey player currently playing for HK Dukla Michalovce of the Tipsport Liga. He previously played in the Kontinental Hockey League for Lada Togliatti, Salavat Yulaev Ufa, Dynamo Moscow, SKA Saint Petersburg, Torpedo Nizhny Novgorod, Avangard Omsk, Admiral Vladivostok and Amur Khabarovsk.

Playing career
As a young defensive prospect he had been a member of Russia's U18 and U20 national squads and has also skated on several occasions, including at the 2008 World Championships in Canada. The young defenceman was drafted by the Toronto Maple Leafs with the 157th overall selection in the 2004 NHL Entry Draft. He has since become one of the top blue liners in the Russian Super League and on Russia's national team.

Career statistics

Regular season and playoffs

International

References

External links

 
 

1985 births
Admiral Vladivostok players
Amur Khabarovsk players
Avangard Omsk players
HK Dukla Michalovce players
HC Dynamo Moscow players
HC Lada Togliatti players
Living people
Sportspeople from Tolyatti
Russian ice hockey defencemen
Salavat Yulaev Ufa players
SKA Saint Petersburg players
Toronto Maple Leafs draft picks
Torpedo Nizhny Novgorod players
Russian expatriate sportspeople in Slovakia
Expatriate ice hockey players in Slovakia
Russian expatriate ice hockey people